The Blooming Prairie Commercial Historic District is a designation applied to the historic downtown of Blooming Prairie, Minnesota, United States.  It comprises 20 contributing properties built between 1893 and 1932.  It was listed as a historic district on the National Register of Historic Places in 1994 for having local significance in the theme of commerce.  It was nominated for being an unusually intact business district of an agricultural trade center on the Chicago, Milwaukee, and St. Paul Railroad.

The Blooming Prairie Commercial Historic District comprises both sides of Main Street East for a distance of two blocks.

See also
 National Register of Historic Places listings in Steele County, Minnesota

References

Buildings and structures in Steele County, Minnesota
Commercial buildings on the National Register of Historic Places in Minnesota
Historic districts on the National Register of Historic Places in Minnesota
National Register of Historic Places in Steele County, Minnesota